Mirg may refer to:
 Mereg
 Mirgah-e Derizh